Qara Tapa is a predominantly Shia Turkmen town in Diyala Governorate, Iraq. It is located south of Kifri. Its name is in the Turkmen dialect, meaning 'black hill'.

History 
In 1820, Claudius Rich visited Qara Tapa, describing it as a village populated by Turkmen. It had 700 houses in 1805 and had reduced to 75 due to fleeing from government oppression.

James Buckingham visited Qara Tapa in the 1820s, describing it as a Turkmen populated village. He estimated the town's size at half of Kifri, with a population of 1,000.

References

Populated places in Diyala Province
District capitals of Iraq
Turkmen communities in Iraq